Tilman Pünder (27 December 1932 – 18 December 2021) was a German politician. A member of the Christian Democratic Union of Germany, he served as Regierungspräsident of Giessen from 1987 to 1989 and Senior City Manager of Münster from 1989 to 1997. He died on 18 December 2021, at the age of 88.

References

1932 births
2021 deaths
20th-century German politicians
21st-century German politicians
Christian Democratic Union of Germany politicians
People from Münster